Archithosia rhyparodactyla is a moth of the subfamily Arctiinae. It was described by Sergius G. Kiriakoff in 1963. It is found in the Democratic Republic of the Congo.

References

 

Lithosiini
Moths described in 1963
Moths of Africa